Moravian Academy  is a preschool through 12th-grade co-educational college preparatory school that predominantly serves students from the Lehigh Valley region of eastern Pennsylvania. Moravian Academy descended from the first school for girls in the Thirteen Colonies, established by Benigna Zinzendorf, a 16-year-old Countess. Moravian Academy is the ninth oldest independent school in the nation.

History
The original school was established in Bethlehem, Pennsylvania in 1742. In 1929, The Swain School, a preschool through 8th-grade secular co-educational independent school, was founded by D. Esther Swain. Later, in 1971, Moravian Seminary for Girls merged with Moravian Preparatory School to form Moravian Academy. In August 2020, Moravian Academy and the Swain School merged, creating a new school still operating under the name Moravian Academy.

The school has more than 900 students and 200 employees from across the region located on three campuses:
Downtown Campus: (preschool - 8th grade), situated along the national historic site in the heart of Bethlehem.
Swain Campus: (preschool - 8th grade), a 22-acre contemporary campus in the west end of Allentown, Pennsylvania.
Merle-Smith Campus: (grades 9- 12),  situated on a 120 acres green expanse in Bethlehem.

Beginning School 
The Beginning School consists of preschool - kindergarten classes on the Downtown and Swain Campuses.  Students in the Beginning School learn through responsive classroom techniques, experiential learning, and learning though play.

Lower School 
The Lower School consists of students in grades 1 - 5 on the Downtown and Swain Campuses. The Lower School focuses on foundations skills, field trips, interdisciplinary project-based learning. Curriculum is built to inspire curiosity, critical thinking, creativity, and perseverance.

Comenius Signature Program 
The Comenius Signature Program is an honors independent study program designed to allow sophomores, juniors, and seniors to design and carry out a research project, under the mentorship of a faculty member and in collaboration with the Comenius committee. Students create projects beyond the Moravian Academy curriculum in areas of personal interest. Learn More.

Administration 
School Leadership History
Henrietta Benigna Justina von Zinzendorf, founded first school in 1742

Principals:
 Reverend John Andrew Huebner (1785-1790)
 Reverend Jacob Van Vleck (1790-1800)
 Andrew Benade (1800-1813)
 Reverend Lewis Huebner (1813)
 Reverend John G. Cunow (1813-1815)
 Right Reverend Charles G. Reichel (1815-1816)
 Reverend Henry Steinbauer (1816-1818)
 Reverend Charles F. Seidel (1818-1819)
 Reverend John F. Frueauff (1819-1821)
 Reverend Lewis Davis deSchweinitz (1821-1822)
 Reverend Charles F. Seidel (1822-1836)

Notable alumni 
Sally Kohn, liberal political commentator
Santo Loquasto, actor and Tony Award winner
Gilmer McCormick, actress

References

External links

Moravian Academy athletics official website
Moravian Academy profile at Niche
Moravian Academy sports coverage at The Express-Times

1742 establishments in Pennsylvania
Bethlehem, Pennsylvania
Educational institutions established in 1742
Educational institutions established in 1971
Educational institutions of the American (North) Province of the Moravian Church
Moravian settlement in Pennsylvania
Private elementary schools in Pennsylvania
Private high schools in the Lehigh Valley
Pennsylvania
Private middle schools in Pennsylvania
Schools in Northampton County, Pennsylvania